Caren Miosga (born 11 April 1969 in Peine) is a German journalist and television presenter.

Early life and education
Caren Miosga grew up in Groß Ilsede, Lower Saxony, and attended the local grammar school. She studied history and Slavic studies in Hamburg.

Miosga is fluent in Russian as she worked as a tour guide in Saint Petersburg and Moscow during her studies.

Career
After completing her studies, Miosga worked for several radio stations – Radio Schleswig-Holstein (R.SH), Radio Hamburg and N-Joy – and the television channel RTL Television North. In 1999, she went to NDR Fernsehen and presented there the Kulturjournal. From May 2006, she hosted ttt Titel, Thesen, Temperamente, the ARD culture magazine.

The following year Miosga succeeded Anne Will and became the new presenter of Tagesthemen, appearing in rotation with successive co-presenters Tom Buhrow (2006–2013), Thomas Roth (2013–2016), and Ingo Zamperoni (2013–2014 and since 2016).

During her time at Tagesthemen, Miosga interviewed Prime Minister Manuel Valls of France on the occasion of his first official visit to Germany in 2014. In 2018, she and Deutsche Welle correspondent Max Hofmann jointly conducted a French-language TV interview with President Emmanuel Macron, his first with a German television channel.

In 2017, Miosga – representing the Tagesthemen editorial staff – was awarded a Goldene Kamera in the category "Best Information". In a 2018 survey conducted by Forsa Institute, she was voted one of Germany's most trusted news presenters.

Personal life 
Miosga is married to pathologist Tobias Grob and has two children. The family of her father originates from Upper Silesia and has Russian roots.

External links

References 

1969 births
Living people
German television presenters
German broadcast news analysts
20th-century German journalists
21st-century German journalists
People from Peine (district)
German women television journalists
German women television presenters
German television journalists
ARD (broadcaster) people
Norddeutscher Rundfunk people
German television news anchors
20th-century German women
21st-century German women